In mathematics, a Connes connection is a noncommutative generalization of a connection in differential geometry. It was introduced by Alain Connes and was later generalized by Cuntz and Quillen.

See also 
 quasi-free algebra

References

 Alain Connes, Noncommutative geometry, Academic Press 1994.

Further reading 
 connection in noncommutative geometry in nLab

Connection (mathematics)
Differential geometry